Jean Gevenois (13 July 1931 – 10 January 2023) was a Belgian physical therapist and politician.

Biography
After his studies in kinesiotherapy, Gevenois worked in a clinic in Baudour until 1981.

He then became schepen in 1971. He remained in this position when the village was incorporated into Boussu in 1977 and served until 1996. In 1983, he became a Senator and served in this position until 1996. During his time in the Senate, he defended public transportation, specifically the National Railway Company of Belgium.

Gevenois died in Hornu on 10 January 2023, at the age of 91.

References

1931 births
2023 deaths
Members of the Senate (Belgium)
Socialist Party (Belgium) politicians